Sue-Ann Post (born 1964) is an Australian comedian and writer.

Self described as "Australia's favourite six-foot, lesbian, ex-Mormon, diabetic, comedian and writer", Post has performed as a stand-up comedian internationally and throughout Australia since 1991.

Her debut stand-up comedy stage show, "A Bit of a Postscript" (1991) toured internationally and received awards at the Melbourne Fringe Arts Festival and the Wellington Arts Festival, and was adapted to become a best-selling book. Sue-Ann has also worked as a shelf stacker, housemaid, shop assistant and printer's assistant. And one memorable winter in Melbourne she worked as a wood splitter at a woodyard for a guy named Blue.

She has written an autobiography A Bit of a Postscript (1997) and a book The Confession of an Unrepentant Lesbian Ex-Mormon (2005) which is about her journey to Salt Lake City, Utah, United States, to deliver a talk to a group of Mormon and ex-Mormon gays and lesbians. A documentary about her journey, The Lost Tribe, aired on ABC's Compass (2005).

She wrote a weekly column for the Melbourne Age for three years and was nominated for the 2002 Human Rights and Equal Opportunity Commission's Print Media Award. Her articles have also appeared in the West Australian, the Freethinker (UK) and Versal (The Netherlands).

Awards 
1999 Barry Award, for G Strings and Jockstraps

Television 
In 1997 her original comedy show "An Ordinary Life" was featured on ABC's "The Smallest Room in the House".

Other Television appearances include Outland (2012), Kath & Kim (2004), The Genie from Down Under, (1996), The Bedroom Commandments (2012) The Glass House (2005), The Lost Tribe (2005), Standing Up (1999), The Panel (1999), Mouthing Off (1996), Something Hot Before Bed (1995).

Personal life and religion 

Sue-Ann Post's comedy and writings have dealt with religion, sexuality, incest and disability.

As a child, Post attended six hours of church every Sunday for study and worship. But, after her father was killed in the Granville Train crash in 1977, Post suffered incest, realised she was a lesbian and questioned whether God existed. She broke all ties with the church at age 20. A staunch atheist, Post has described religion as being "like going without the lobster in favour of the invisible dessert" and speaks regularly on the topic at events such as the Global Atheist Convention (2010).

References

External links
Official Web Site
Interview with Post by Richard Fidler ABC Local Radio (details and MP3 Podcast)
Austlit – Post, Sue-Ann (Retrieved 31 March 2008)

1964 births
Living people
Australian women comedians
Australian memoirists
Former Latter Day Saints
Australian lesbian writers
Lesbian comedians
Australian women memoirists
LGBT Latter Day Saints
Australian atheists
Australian LGBT comedians